Beware of Dogs is a 2014 Indian Malayalam-language comedy drama film written and directed by Vishnu Sivaprasad. The plot follows four bachelors nicknamed Dogs by their house owner, Dominic, Oomen, Gautam, and Sunny. Starring Siju Wilson, Sekhar Menon, Sanju Sivram, and Sreenath Bhasi.

Plot 
The movie starts off with Thulsiandan Pillai introducing himself, his wife Radhika and daughter Meera who studies in the general Engineering college in the area. When a sound comes from above, Thulsi explains it to be the "Dogs". Dominic - A boy with many offers from the US but is stuck with his girlfriend, Tina who threatens that if he dumps her she will commit suicide. He avoids her calls by saying he is in a meeting, etc. He also always says he's thinking of a business. Oomen - A boy who is a waiter at a bar. Gautam - A singer and guitarist who works at a bar. Sunny - A boy who is a women's perfume addict. He uses his knowledge in the perfume field to seduce women. This leads to Thulsi to put up a warning board saying "Beware of DOGS".

Oomen, upon receiving a job in Pondicherry, leaves. Thulsi is relieved. Soon after Oomen leaves, Gautam resigns from his job as a move because his manager does not pay him enough, but in turn loses his guitar. Gautam mourns over the loss of his guitar. So he calls Omanakuttan, a wealthy friend. He asks if he can buy a new guitar for him, Omanakuttan, in response, overloads him with money.

In the night, Gautam receives a suicide text from Omanakuttan. Going there they realise that he has eaten two bottles of sleeping pills. Hurrying him to the hospital, he is saved. Omanakuttan comes to stay with them, forcing Thulsi to draw back the "O" in beware of dogs, he also makes the "O" fat to show how fat Omanakuttan is.

During this period of time, Thulsi says to Dominic that if he does not move out or pay the rent, he will have to tell Baptist. Dominic is puzzled by who it is, but is convinced that it is a thug. He goes upstairs and narrates whatever happened downstairs. Gautam is shocked at first and says that he knows this "Thug".

A few months ago, he came to the bar he was working in. He has a drink and pays for it in "Baptist" money. When the bar waiter enquires about the person on the note, he is beaten up by his thugs. But Gautam relives the group by saying Baptist won't take these silly cases. The rest of the plot follows.

Cast

Soundtrack
The music is composed by Bijibal.
Pandan Nayude - Jecin George, Deepak Dev
Marimukil -  Niranj Suresh

Release 
Nowrunning wrote that "The escalating ridiculousness makes Beware of Dogs a tough watch. Entirely hackneyed and frivolous, it's one of those films that make you go 'Bow-wow' in angst and sheer protest".

References

External links
 

Indian comedy-drama films
2014 films
2010s Malayalam-language films
2014 comedy-drama films